The 64th Infantry Regiment was a Regular infantry regiment in the United States Army.

Lineage

 Constituted 15 May 1917 in the Regular Army as the 64th Infantry. Organized 1 June 1917 at Camp Baker, Texas, from personnel of the 34th infantry. Assigned to the 7th Infantry Division 16 November 1917. 

 Relieved from the 7th Division and demobilized 31 July 1922 at Plattsburg Barracks, New York

 Reconstituted 18 July 1941 in the Regular Army. 

 Disbanded 4 August 1952.

Campaign streamers
World War I
 Lorraine 1918

Coat of arms

The regiment was organized in 1917 from personnel of the 34th Infantry which is shown on the canton. It was in the 7th Division operating in Lorraine in the area formerly in the domain of the ancient lords of commercy whose arms were blue, scattered with golden cross crosslets, pointed at the lower end. The shield is blue for infantry with one such cross crosslet. The crest is the thistle of Lorraine, one of the old emblems of that provence and still existing in the arms of Nancy.

References

 Encyclopedia of United States Army insignia and uniforms By William K. Emerson (page 51).

External links
 http://www.history.army.mil/html/forcestruc/lh.html

064
Military units and formations established in 1917
Military units and formations disestablished in 1952
United States Army regiments of World War I